Gürcüvən (also, Gyurdzhivan) is a village in the Shamakhi Rayon of Azerbaijan.

References 

Populated places in Shamakhi District